Kazan Secondary School № 18 with Intensive English Learning is a state educational organization for children from 7(6) to 18(17) years old. It is a typical Russian school with eleven forms. After ending school students receive government standard diploma of secondary education which allows them to enter university.

Location 
 
It is situated on 6 Mushtari Street in Vahitov district of Kazan. The building is the 19th century mansion where initially Kazan Female diocesan college was.

History 

The school founded in 1959 was the first to specialize in the English language in the Republic of Tatarstan. Throughout its history, it has gained renowned traditions and customs. Its current headmaster Sheveleva Nadiya Mazgutovna has been running the school for more than 40 years. School students and teachers take part in different contests and events such as volunteering in Kazan Zoo, Zelenodolsk elderly house, in different sports events including world ones (Universiade 2013, FINA 2015), olympiads on different subjects.

School curriculum

As a part of the Russian educational system, school №18 contains three levels of the school system: primary (1-4 forms), middle (5-9 forms) and high (10-11 forms). After finishing the ninth form students have a choice what subjects they will have. Some of the variants are:
second foreign language (Chinese/German/ Arabic)
journalism 
information technologies 
economics 
law

Traditions 
 
 Halloween

On this holiday students are allowed to wear scary costumes and go trick-or-treating during the breaks. English classes on Halloween are full of terrifying and at the same time fun activities.

 Christmas concert

This tradition was established not so long time ago but has become one of favorite among both students and teachers. Everyone gets an opportunity to show their music talent. However, since there are a lot of talented pupils auditions are held in order to choose the best ones.

 New Year's fairy tale

10- and 11-form students set up a play for primary schoolers.

 St. Valentine's Ball

To celebrate February, 14 the annual ball is organized by the School Republic of self-government. This event includes activities to get acquainted with students from other forms, and the most thrilling part is the announcement of the best couple.

 English Song Festival

The festival's aim is to learn about English music. The School Republic of Self-government annually chooses the theme of the whole festival. For instance, Eurovision songs, soundtracks, rock-n-roll. pop-music etc. The performance should include background information about the song and of course singing.

 Festival of foreign countries

Another festival takes place in school №18. A representative from each grade participates in drawing lots to decide what country will be shown. Some small countries, as well as world powers, can be gotten. Presentation of countries should consist of three parts: a creative and informative poster, short speech on the stage about the country and music or acting performance, traditionally students dance or sing.

References

External links
School website
Edu.Tatar.ru

Education in Kazan